All-Star Baseball 2002 is a baseball sports game released for PlayStation 2 and GameCube in 2001.

Reception

The PlayStation 2 version received "generally favorable reviews", while the GameCube version received "average" reviews, according to the review aggregation website Metacritic. In Japan, Famitsu gave it a score of 24 out of 40 for PlayStation 2 version.

References

External links
 

2001 video games
Baseball video games
GameCube games
All-Star Baseball video games
PlayStation 2 games
Acclaim Entertainment games
Video games developed in the United States